Jamsetjee is a given name. Notable people with the name include:

Avabai Jamsetjee Jeejeebhoy (born 1793), the wife of Sir Jamsetjee Jeejeebhoy, 1st baronet
Sir Jamsetjee Jejeebhoy, 1st Baronet (1783–1859), also spelt Jeejeebhoy or Jeejebhoy, was a Parsi-Indian merchant and philanthropist
Sir Jamsetjee Jejeebhoy, 2nd Baronet, CSI, (1811–1877), Indian businessman
Sir Jamsetjee Jejeebhoy, 3rd Baronet, CSI, (1851–1898), Indian businessman
Sir Jamsetjee Jejeebhoy, 4th Baronet, (1853–1908), Indian businessman
Sir Jamsetjee Jejeebhoy, 5th Baronet, KCSI, (1878–1931), Indian businessman

See also
Sir Jamsetjee Jeejebhoy School of Art (Sir J. J. School of Art), is the oldest art institution in Mumbai, and is affiliated with the University of Mumbai